Hansari was a village of Babina Block in Jhansi district, now evolved as a suburb of Jhansi District, Uttar Pradesh, India.

Demographics
 India census, the town had a population of 15,128 of which 8,102 were males while 7,026 were females as per report released by Census India 2001.

The town had an average literacy rate of 59.66%; with male literacy of 37.48% and female literacy of 21.97%. 16.05% of the population was under 6 years of age.

History
Hansari was a large jagir of 50 Villages in India during the British Raj. The Estate was administered as a part of the Bundelkhand Agency of Central India. It was governed by Bhatelas  clan  ,Hansari was a part of the Princely State of Orchha . The rulers of Orchha gave this jagir to Bhatelas in 1779.  In 1930 Britishers awarded jagirdars of  Hansari with the title of Raja.

Dada Narayan Singh was a notable member of this  family. He was awarded  with the title of His Highness "Raja Saheb" by the British Raj.  During his political career Dada Narayan Singh had close relations with former Indian Prime Minister Indira Gandhi.kumwari sudha Kumari ji and Surendra Singh were the children of Narayan Singh ji .

Utanga Hanuman Ji Temple

Uttanga Hanuman Ji Temple is an ancient temple Of Hanuman Ji in hansari, Uttangha Wale Hanuman ji is regarded as the guardian Of Jagirdars Of Hansari.
Avadh kunwari devoted the land for the construction of temple and built the temple of lord Hanuman ji.

Rulers

Kunwar Bhadur Singh (Diwan Of Orchha state,founder of Hansari Jagir) (1779-1791)
Kunwar Ranjit Singh (1791-1821)
 Kunwar Raghvendra Singh (1821-1861)
kunwar Bar Singh (1861-1891)
 Kunwar Amar Singh (1891-1895)
Kunwar Praan Singh (1895-1901)
 Kunwar Mazboot Singh (1901-1918)
Kunwar Devi Singh (1918-1922)
 Kunwarani Avadh Bai (1922-1927)

In 1930, the British awarded the rulers of Hansari with the title of Raja

 Raja Narayan Singh (1927-1950)
 Raja Surendhra Singh
 Now its fully in control of indian government

References

Villages in Jhansi district